Erebor Mons is a mountain on Titan, the largest moon of the planet Saturn. It is 40 km across, more than 1 km high, and has lobate flow features to its north and east. It is probably a cryovolcano. Erebor Mons is situated about 470 km to the north-northeast of a larger cryovolcanic construct, Doom Mons.

Erebor Mons is one of the highest known mountains of Titan, but it is not readily discernible on radar or infrared images. It was discovered only when stereoscopic radar data allowed the construction of an elevation map. It was imaged by Cassini radar 22 February and 10 April 2007.

Erebor Mons is named after Erebor, the "Lonely Mountain" that appears in J. R. R. Tolkien's fictional world of Middle-earth, most prominently in The Hobbit. The name follows a convention that Titanean Mountains are named after mountains in Tolkien's work. The name was formally announced on November 13, 2012.

References

External links
 Map of Titan with names of geologic features (PDF, 1,4 Mb)

See also
 List of geological features on Titan

Extraterrestrial mountains
Surface features of Titan (moon)
Extraterrestrial surface features named for Middle-earth